Jarkko Kauppinen (born 6 April 1982) is a Finnish biathlete. He was born in Vieremä. He competed at the Biathlon World Championships 2011, 2012 and 2013. He competed at the 2014 Winter Olympics in Sochi, in sprint and individual.

References

External links

1982 births
Living people
People from Vieremä
Biathletes at the 2014 Winter Olympics
Finnish male biathletes
Olympic biathletes of Finland
Sportspeople from North Savo